MIT Global Startup Workshop (MIT GSW) is an event organized by the Massachusetts Institute of Technology run by a student group in association with Martin Trust Center for MIT Entrepreneurship, the MIT Legatum Center for Development and Entrepreneurship, and the MIT Regional Entrepreneurship Acceleration Program (MIT REAP).

MIT GSW is an annual conference.

Since 1998, the organization has held 21 international workshops across 6 continents.

History 
The MIT Global Startup Workshop (MIT GSW) was founded in 1997 when the MIT $50K (now the MIT $100K) Entrepreneurship Competition received numerous queries from around the world from organizations interested in starting and improving their own business plan competitions (BPCs). The first MIT GSW was held in Cambridge, Massachusetts in March 1998. A decade later, in 2007 the MIT GSW expanded its mission to include all aspects of the entrepreneurial ecosystem. Since its founding, the MIT GSW has held 21 international workshops across 6 continents, reached participants from over 70 nations, and grown to become the premier workshop for fostering global entrepreneurship.

 2019 : Bogota, Colombia
 2018 : Bangkok, Thailand
 2017 : Santiago, Chile 
 2016 : Hyderabad, India
 2015 : Guatemala City, Guatemala
 2014 : Marrakech, Morocco
 2013 : Tallinn, Estonia
 2012 : Istanbul, Turkey  
 2011 : Seoul, Republic of Korea
 2010 : Reykjavik, Iceland
 2009 : Cape Town, South Africa 
 2008 : Madrid, Spain 
 2007 : Trondheim, Norway 
 2006 : Buenos Aires, Argentina

Featured past speakers 
 Olafur Ragnar Grimsson, President Of Iceland
 Toomas Hendrik Ilves, President Of The Republic Of  Estonia
 Hwang Chang-Gyu, National CTO Of South Korea
 Dean Kamen, Inventor Of Segway
 Robin Chase, Founder Of Zipcar
 Krisztina 'Z' Holly, Founder Of The First Tedx
 Bill Aulet, Managing Director Of the MIT Martin Trust Center
 Desh Desphande, Founder Of MIT Deshpande Center for Innovation 
 Ariya Banomyong, Managing Director of LINE Thailand
 Pita Limjaroenrat, Executive Director, Grab Thailand

Structure of the conference
MIT GSW platform facilitates conversations via panels and keynotes at the interface of 
 Entrepreneurship
Government Policy
Social and Development issues
Corporate responsibility
Startup culture and ecosystem
MIT GSW is also a platform for extensive coaching for participants through a Business Plan Competition, Elevator Pitch Competition, and active mentoring for startups.

MIT GSW Competitions
MIT GSW offers multiple competitions of different scales and topical interests each year. Historically, GSW has included competitions, like the Elevator Pitch Competition, a Business Plan Competition, and a Startup Showcase, to shed light on innovative ventures and projects in the region of interest. Mentorship, scale, themes, and prizes vary in each edition of the conference.

See also
 Massachusetts Institute of Technology
 Martin Trust Center for MIT Entrepreneurship

References

Entrepreneurship organizations
Massachusetts Institute of Technology